Dov Nisman (דב ניסמן; born July 22, 1954) is an Israeli former Olympic swimmer.

Early life
Nisman was born in Israel, and is Jewish.  He grew up on a kibbutz in the Upper Galilee in Israel. He later attended Youngstown State University. Subsequently, for decades he was the owner of Applied Laser Technologies, in Cleveland, Ohio, and was a resident of Beachwood, Ohio.

Swimming career
Nisman competed for Israel at the 1976 Summer Olympics in Montreal, Quebec, Canada, at the age of 21. In the Men's 400 metre Individual Medley he came in 6th in Heat 4 with a time of 4:47.13.

Swimming for Youngstown State in 1979 at the NCAA Men's Division II Swimming and Diving Championships, he came in 5th in the 200 yard race.

Representing Israel in 2015 at the 16th FINA World Masters Championships in Kazan, Russia, he won gold medals in the 200-meter and 400-meter medley, and silver medals in the 200-meter butterfly and 800-meter freestyle.

Later life
After he retired, Nisman moved back to Israel.

References

External links
 

Living people
Swimmers at the 1976 Summer Olympics
People from Beachwood, Ohio
Youngstown State University alumni
1954 births
Israeli male swimmers
Jewish swimmers
People from Northern District (Israel)
Olympic swimmers of Israel